A Postcard from Hell is the second full-length studio album by Israeli punk band Kill the Drive. It was released on May 12, 2009, in Japan through Radtone Music and on September 10, 2009, in Israel, in a special release show that took place at the OzenBar in Tel Aviv. The album was produced by Useless ID frontman Yotam Ben Horin, engineered by the band's singer/bassist Eyal Reiner and mixed & mastered by Daniel Balistocky at Revolution 9 Recording Studios in Los Angeles.

It is the band's only album before becoming a four-piece in 2010.

Track listing

Personnel
Eyal Reiner - lead vocals, bass
Lavy Josephsohn - guitar, backing vocals
Gideon Berger - drums, percussion

Production
Yotam Ben-Horin - production
Daniel Balistocky - mixing, mastering
Eyal Reiner - engineering

References

2009 albums
Kill the Drive albums